Adilson Ferreira de Souza (born 1 September 1978), commonly known as Popó, is a Brazilian retired footballer. Mainly a forward, he also played as an attacking midfielder.

Club career
Born in Andradina, São Paulo, Popó made his senior debuts for clubs in his native state, and moved to Primeira Liga's S.C. Salgueiros after a short stint in Uruguay. He made his debut for the latter on 7 December 1997, in a 2–2 away draw against S.L. Benfica.

After being mostly used as a substitute, Popó opted to rescind with the Portuguese outfit, and moved to Club América. He then returned to his home country in 2000, appearing for lower league clubs.

On 11 May 2004 Popó moved to Coritiba. However, he suffered an injury and only appeared sparingly for the club.

In the 2005 summer Popó moved to Busan I'Park; after being a regular starter for the side, he moved to fellow league team Gyeongnam FC in 2007. He was, however, loaned to Kashiwa Reysol in 2008.

After a two-season spell at Kashiwa, Popó signed permanently for Vissel Kobe. He remained in Japan for the following years, representing Urawa Red Diamonds, Vissel Kobe and Júbilo Iwata.

On 20 January 2015 Popó joined Portuguesa, freshly relegated to Série C.

Club statistics

References

External links

1978 births
Living people
Footballers from São Paulo (state)
Brazilian footballers
Association football midfielders
Association football forwards
Mogi Mirim Esporte Clube players
Clube Atlético Sorocaba players
Associação Esportiva Araçatuba players
Coritiba Foot Ball Club players
Associação Portuguesa de Desportos players
Montevideo Wanderers F.C. players
Primeira Liga players
S.C. Salgueiros players
Club América footballers
K League 1 players
Busan IPark players
Gyeongnam FC players
J1 League players
J2 League players
Kashiwa Reysol players
Vissel Kobe players
Urawa Red Diamonds players
Júbilo Iwata players
Brazilian expatriate footballers
Brazilian expatriate sportspeople in Uruguay
Brazilian expatriate sportspeople in Portugal
Brazilian expatriate sportspeople in Mexico
Brazilian expatriate sportspeople in South Korea
Brazilian expatriate sportspeople in Japan
Expatriate footballers in Uruguay
Expatriate footballers in Portugal
Expatriate footballers in Mexico
Expatriate footballers in South Korea
Expatriate footballers in Japan
People from Andradina